At Eighteen is a 2019 South Korean television series starring Ong Seong-wu, Kim Hyang-gi, Shin Seung-ho, and Kang Ki-young. The series marks Ong's first official lead role. It aired on JTBC from July 22 to September 10, 2019.

Synopsis
At Eighteen follows the story of eighteen-year-old Choi Joon-woo (Ong Seong-wu), whose teenage life has been molded by his meager family life and the conflicts he faced in school. Forced to transfer schools for a violation he did not commit, he arrives at Cheonbong High School where he has decided to be a nobody: a loner just quietly riding out 11th grade. Little does he know the twists and turns and the surprises in store for his eighteen-year-old life.

Soon, the loner inside Joon-woo has to come out of his comfort zone. Not only Joon-woo, but his fellow immature and inexperienced eighteen-year-olds, too, will have conflicts and whirlwinds of emotions and face the prejudices of a world shaped by the adults around them. Together, they have to live their lives to the max and make life-changing decisions. And most of all, they must not forget to cherish every moment of their lives. For all they know, the memories of their nineteenth year of life might be the sweetest, the most precious, and the most unforgettable.

Cast

Main
 Ong Seong-wu as Choi Joon-woo
 Jung Hyun-joon as child Choi Joon-woo
 A student of Class 2-3 who has gotten used to being lonely and is not practiced in expressing his emotions. He is forced to transfer to Cheonbong High School for a violation he did not commit and is used to being solitary at school. Being a transferee, he is an object of ridicule and prejudice from his new classmates. But as he adapts to the new environment, he becomes closer with his classmates and earns the friendship of his crush, top student Soo-bin.
 Kim Hyang-gi as Yoo Soo-bin
 A top student of Class 2-3 who has no clear goals and ambition as her life is controlled by her mother, who wants her to enroll in prestigious colleges in Seoul. Despite her opposition, she is forced to meet tutors and attend private classes and to strictly check her performance at school. She is among the few people in school who know of Joon-woo's real personality. She gradually starts to have feelings for Joon-woo.
 Shin Seung-ho as Ma Hwi-young
 A top student of Class 2-3 from an affluent family who seems to be courageous and strong but is suffering from a complex. He is the president of their class and is known for acing every subject in school. Unknown to everyone, he is forced by his perfectionist and physically abusive father to be the best in everything. He also has the habit of scratching his wrist when in distress. Due to this negative family life, he tends to see his peers as subordinate to him, a personality discovered by Joon-woo and their homeroom teacher Mr. Oh.
 Kang Ki-young as Oh Han-kyeol
 The homeroom teacher of Class 2-3. He is formerly an assistant homeroom teacher temporarily in charge of Class 2-3, whose official HT is hospitalized. After an incident at school, he asks the vice-principal for him to be promoted as the official HT of Class 2-3. He is a shopaholic and, as a teacher, is frequently nervous when dealing with challenges in the class.

Supporting

Students
 Lee Seung-min as Lee Ki-tae
 Class 2-3 student; So-ye's boyfriend and a part of Hwi-young's clique. He keeps himself close to Hwi-young to gain his friendship and be included in private study groups, to the extent that most would see him as Hwi-young's servant.
 Moon Bin as Jung Oh-je
 Class 2-3 student; Joon-woo's seatmate and best friend. He is handsome, athletic, and likes to play basketball; he is Da-heen's crush. In his family, he would help his father out by either managing their tteokbokki shop or taking care of his baby brother. It is revealed in later episodes that he is gay; he harbored a secret crush on Hwi-young.
 Kim Do-wan as Cho Sang-hoon
 Class 2-1 student. A natural genius, particularly in math, he sees Hwi-young as his rival in academics.
 Yoo In-soo as Yoo Pil-sang
 Class 2-3 student. Rough on the outside, he has his own charms. He has a crush on Ro-mi.
 Baek Jae-woo as Go Dong
 Class 2-3 student. He frequently accompanies Pil-sang.
 Woo Joon-seo as Park Kyu-nam
 Class 2-3 student. He likes to play mobile games.
 Shin Ki-joon as Ha Shim-bok
 Class 2-3 student. He is also a part of Hwi-young's clique.
 Kim Ga-hee as Moon Chan-yeol
 Class 2-3 student; one of Soo-bin's friends. Though boyish, she has a crush on their homeroom teacher Mr. Oh.
 Moon Joo-yeon as Yoon So-ye
 Class 2-3 student; Ki-tae's girlfriend and one of Soo-bin's friends. She is a ballet dancer.
 Kim Bo-yoon as Kwon Da-heen
 Class 2-3 student; one of Soo-bin's friends. She has a strong crush on Oh-je.
 Han Sung-min as Hwang Ro-mi
 Class 2-3 student; one of Soo-bin's friends. She is jealous of Soo-bin being in the top tier. She has a crush on Joon-woo and would ignore Pil-sang's advances.

Parents
 Shim Yi-young as Lee Yeon-woo
Joon-woo's mother. A single young mother, she runs a restaurant but is in debt. She loves Joon-woo very much.
 Choi Jae-woong as Choi Myeong-joon
Joon-woo's father. He broke up with Yeon-woo when he found out he had accidentally bore her a child (Joon-woo). He has his own family now.
 Kim Sun-young as Yoon Song-hee
Soo-bin's mother. She forces Soo-bin to be top in class and prepare for going to an in-Seoul college. She is in bad terms with her husband Jong-soo, who has now a new woman.
 Lee Hae-young as Yoo Jong-soo
Soo-bin's father. He wants to be divorced with his wife, but he loves Soo-bin as his daughter.
 Jung Young-joo as Park Geum-ja
Hwi-young's mother. Spoiling her son and out of the fear of starting her husband's fury, she would use her wealth to manipulate Hwi-young's teachers.
 Sung Ki-yoon as Ma Yoon-gi
Hwi-young's father. Forcing his son to be top of his class, he puts both his wife and Hwi-young through emotional abuse.

Others
 Park Sung-geun as Lee Kwan-yong
Vice-principal of Cheonbong High School
 Heo Young-ji as Kim Ji-min
An employee at the convenience store where Joon-woo works part-time. She usually calls Joon-woo as "Park Young-bae" (the name written on the second-hand uniform Joon-woo is using at work). She is trying hard to find a better work. She is Mr. Oh's love interest.
 Choi Woo-sung as Im Gun-hyuk
 Joon-woo's former schoolmate
 Choi Dae-hoon as Teacher Son
Mathematics lecturer
 Lee Seung-il as Joo Hyun-jang
 Jeon Jin-seo

Special appearances
 Song Geon-hee as Shin Jung-hoo ( 3–4)
 Joon-woo's childhood friend and former schoolmate
 Kang Hoon as Ma Hwi-young's older brother ( 16)

Original soundtrack

Part 1

Part 2

Part 3

Part 4

Part 5

Part 6

Viewership

Awards and nominations

Notes

References

External links
  
 
 

JTBC television dramas
Korean-language television shows
2019 South Korean television series debuts
2019 South Korean television series endings
South Korean high school television series
South Korean teen dramas
Television series about teenagers
Television series by KeyEast
Television series by Drama House